Boomgaardshoek is a neighborhood of Rotterdam, Netherlands.

This part of Hoogvliet was built at the end of 1970s and early 1980s and finished by the end of the 1980s.

When they started building this area, it belonged to Poortugaal, in 1986 it became part of Rotterdam. One part of Boomgaardshoek has bird names and the other part has names of flowers. Those two are separated by a bike lane which comes from south Zalmplaat to North Tussenwater.

References

Neighbourhoods of Rotterdam